Estonia competed at the 2009 World Championships in Athletics from 15–23 August. A team of 19 athletes was announced in preparation for the competition. Selected athletes have achieved one of the competition's qualifying standards. The team includes reigning Olympic discus throw champion Gerd Kanter and European Indoor champions Mikk Pahapill and Ksenija Balta.

Medalists

Team selection

Track and road events

Field and combined events

Results

Men
Track and road events

Field events

Women
Field and combined events

References

External links
Official competition website

Nations at the 2009 World Championships in Athletics
World Championships in Athletics
2009